In college football, 2004 NCAA football bowl games may refer to:

2003–04 NCAA football bowl games, for games played in January 2004 as part of the 2003 season.
2004–05 NCAA football bowl games, for games played in December 2004 as part of the 2004 season.